This collection of lists of law topics collects the names of topics related to law. Everything related to law, even quite remotely, should be included on the alphabetical list, and on the appropriate topic lists.  All links on topical lists should also appear in the main alphabetical listing. The process of creating lists is ongoing – these lists are neither complete nor up-to-date – if you see an article that should be listed but is not (or one that shouldn't be listed as legal but is), please update the lists accordingly. You may also want to include Wikiproject Law talk page banners on the relevant pages.

A
a posteriori –
ab extra –
ab initio –
Abandoned property –
Abandonment (legal) –
Abduction –
Abet –
Abeyance –
Abolitionism in the United States –
Abolitionism –
Abortion –
Abortion, legal and moral issues –
Abrogate –
Abstention doctrine –
Abstract –
Abstract of judgment –
Abstract of title –
Abuse of discretion –
Abuse of process –
Abut –
Acceleration (law) –
Accept –
Acceptance –
Acceptance of service –
Accessory –
Accommodation –
Accomplice –
Accord and satisfaction –
Account stated –
Accountability –
Accounting period –
Accounting reference date –
Accounts payable –
Accounts receivable –
Accrue –
Accusation –
Accused –
Acknowledge –
Acknowledgement of service –
Acknowledgment –
Acquis –
Acquit –
Acquittal –
Act of God –
Act of Parliament –
Action –
Actionable –
Actual controversy –
Actual malice –
Actual notice –
actus reus –
ad colligenda bona –
ad hoc –
ad idem –
ad infinitum –
ad litem –
ad quod damnum –
ad seriatim –
ad valorem –
Addendum –
Adeem –
Ademption –
Adequate remedy –
Adhesion contract –
Adjourn –
Adjournment sine die –
Adjournment in contemplation of dismissal –
Adjudication –
Adjusted basis –
Adjuster –
Administer –
Administration –
administration order –
Administrative hearing –
Administrative law –
Administrative law judge –
Administrative Procedure Act (Japan) –
Administrative Procedure Act (United States) –
Administrator –
Administrator –
Admiralty actions –
Admiralty court –
Admiralty law –
Admissible evidence –
Admission against interest –
Admission of evidence –
Admission (law) –
Admission to bail –
Admission to the bar –
Adopt –
Adoption –
Adultery –
Advance directive –
Adversary system –
Adverse –
Adverse interest –
Adverse party –
Adverse possession –
Adverse witness –
Advisory opinion –
Advocate –
Affiant –
Affidavit –
Affirm –
Affirmative action –
Affirmative defense –
Affix –
Affreightment –
After-acquired property –
Age discrimination –
Age of consent –
Age of majority –
Agency –
Agency agreement –
Agent –
Agent for acceptance of service –
Aggravated assault –
Agreed statement –
Aid and abet –
Aleatory –
Alias –
Alibi –
Alien –
Alienation –
Alienation of affections –
Alimony –
All the estate I own –
Allegation –
Allege –
Allocation questionnaire –
Allocatur –
Allocution –
Allodial –
Alluvion –
Alodium –
alter ego –
Alternate director –
Alternative dispute resolution –
Alternative Minimum Tax –
Alternative pleading –
ALWD Citation Manual –
Ambiguity –
Ambulance chasing –
Amelioration Act 1798 –
Amended complaint –
Amended pleading –
American Academy of Appellate Lawyers –
American Arbitration Association –
American Bar Association –
American Civil Liberties Union –
American Civil Rights Movement –
American Declaration of the Rights and Duties of Man –
American Depositary Receipt –
American Law Institute –
amicus curiae –
Amnesty –
Amnesty International –
Amortization –
An eye for an eye –
Ancillary administration –
Ancillary jurisdiction –
Ancillary relief –
Animal rights –
Animal rights by country or territory –
Animal law –
Animal Law Review –
Animal Legal Defense Fund –
Animal trial –
Animal Welfare Act of 1966 –
animus nocendi –
Animus revertendi –
annual general meeting –
Annul –
Annulment –
Anomie –
Answer (law) –
Antecedent (law) –
Antenuptial (prenuptial) agreement –
Antejuramentum –
Anticipatory breach –
Antidisestablishmentarianism –
Antinomianism –
Antitrust –
Antitrust laws –
Apartheid –
Ape personhood –
Apparent authority –
Appeal –
Appeal bond –
Appeals court –
Appear –
Appellant –
Appellate court –
Appellate review –
Appellee –
Appraiser –
Appreciate –
Appreciation –
Apprenticeship 
Approach the bench 
Appurtenances 
Appurtenant 
Arbitrary 
Arbitration –
Arbitration award –
Arbitrator –
arguendo –
Argumentative –
Arm's length –
Arraign –
Arraignment –
Arrears –
Arrest –
Arrest warrant –
Arson –
Article I and Article III tribunals –
Articles of Association –
Articles of impeachment –
Articles of Incorporation –
Articles of War –
As is –
Asharite –
Assault –
Asset –
Assignment (law) –
Assigned risk –
Assignee –
Assignment for benefit of creditors –
Assigns –
Assisted person –
Assize Court –
Associate justice –
Association –
Assumption of risk –
Asylum and Immigration Tribunal –
Asylum seeker –
At will –
At will employment –
Attachment –
Attachment of earnings –
Attempt –
Attestation clause –
Attorney at law (or attorney-at-law) –
Attorney general –
Attorney of record –
Attorney's advertising –
Attorney's fee –
Attorney's work product –
Attorney–client privilege –
Attorney-in-fact –
Attractive nuisance doctrine –
Audit –
Auditor –
Australian Constitution –
Australian Constitutional history –
Australian copyright law –
Authorised share capital –
Authoritarianism –
Authority –
Authorize –
Automatic stay –
Autrefois acquit –
Avulsion –
Ayatollah

B
B.C.L. –
Babylonian law –
Bachelor of Civil Law –
Bachelor of Laws –
Bachelor of Legal Letters –
Back-to-back life sentences –
Bad debt –
Bad faith –
Bail –
Bail bond –
Bail bondsman –
Bail schedule –
Bailee –
Bailiff –
Bailment –
Bailor –
Bait and switch –
Balance due –
Balance sheet –
Ban –
Bank –
Bankrupt –
Bankruptcy –
Bankruptcy court –
Bankruptcy proceedings –
Bankruptcy remote –
Bar –
Bar association –
Bar council –
Bar examination –
Bare trust –
Bargain and sale deed –
Barratry (admiralty law) –
Barratry (common law) –
Barrister –
Basic Law of various jurisdictions –
Battery –
Beach bum trust provision –
Bearer paper –
Belief –
Bench –
Bench memorandum –
Bench trial –
Bench warrant –
Beneficial interest –
Beneficial use –
Beneficiary –
Beneficiary (trust) –
Benefit of counsel –
Bequeath –
Bequest –
Berne three-step test –
Best evidence rule –
Best Interests of the Child –
Bestiality –
Beyond a reasonable doubt –
BFP –
Bias –
Bifurcate –
Bifurcation –
Bigamy –
Bilateral contract –
Bill –
Bill of attainder –
Bill of costs –
Bill of exchange –
Bill of indictment –
Bill of lading –
Bill of particulars –
Bill of rights –
Bill of sale –
Bind over –
Bind over for sentence –
Binding arbitration –
Bioethics –
Black's Law Dictionary –
Blackmail –
Blank endorsement –
Blood libel –
Blue law –
Blue laws –
Blue ribbon jury –
Blue Sky Laws –
Bluebook –
Board of directors –
bona fide –
Bona fide purchaser –
bona vacantia –
Bond –
Bond for deed –
Booby trap –
Book account –
Book value –
Bootleg recording –
Border control –
Bottomry –
Boycott –
Breach of contract –
Breach of promise –
Breach of the peace –
Breach of warranty –
Breaking and entering –
Bribery –
Bride price –
Brief –
British constitution –
British constitutional law –
British nationality law –
Broker –
Brought to trial –
Building and loan –
Bulk sale –
Bulk sales acts –
Bulk transfer –
Burden –
Burden of proof –
Burgage –
Burglary –
Business –
Business ethics –
Business invitee –
But for rule –
Buy-sell agreement –
Bylaw –
Bylaws –
Bypass trust

C
Cadastral map –
cadit quaestio –
Calendar call –
Caliphate –
Call to the bar –
Calumny –
Campaign finance reform in the United States –
Canadian Bill of Rights –
Canadian Charter of Rights and Freedoms –
Caning –
Cannabis: Legal issues –
Canon –
Canon law –
Cape (writ) –
capital –
Capital account –
Capital assets –
Capital expenditure –
Capital gain –
Capital gain tax –
Capital gains –
Capital investment –
Capital loss –
Capital offense –
Capital punishment –
Capital punishment in the United States –
Capital stock –
Capitalized value –
Capricious –
Carjacking –
Carnal knowledge –
Carrier –
Carrying for hire –
Cartel –
Case –
Case conference –
Case law –
Case law in the United States –
Case number –
Case of first impression –
Case-based reasoning –
Cashier's check –
Casualty insurance –
Casualty loss –
Casuistry –
Catechism –
Categorical Imperative –
Catholic Emancipation –
cause –
Cause of action –
caveat emptor –
Cease and desist order –
Censorship –
Certificate of deposit –
Certificate of incorporation –
Certificate of legal aid costs –
Certificate of title –
Certified check –certiorari –
Writ of Certiorari –
Cessate –
Cestui que trust –
Cestui que use –ceteris paribus –
Chain of title –
Chairman –
Challenge for cause –
Champerty –
Chancellor –
Chancery –
Chancery division –
Change of venue –
Character witness –
Charge –
Charging lien –
Charging order –
Charitable contribution –
Charitable organization –
Charitable remainder trust –
Charitable trust –
Charter –
Chattel –
Chattel mortgage-- Checks and balances –
Cheque –
Chief Justice –
Chief Justice of Canada –
Chief Justice of the United States –
Child –
Child abandonment –
Child abuse –
Child custody –
Child endangerment –
Child neglect –
Child pornography –
Child sexual abuse –
Child support –
Chinese law –
Churning –
Circuit courts –
Circumcision –
Circumstantial evidence –
Citation –
Cite –
Citizen –
Citizen's dividend –
Citizenship –
Civil action –
Civil and social disobedience –
Civil calendar –
Civil code –
Civil Code of Quebec –
Civil commitment –
Civil death –
Civil disobedience –
Civil disorder –
Civil justice reforms –
civil law –
Civil law notary –
Civil liability –
Civil liberties –
Civil penalties –
Civil procedure –
Civil rights –
Civil union –
Claim against a governmental agency –
Claim against an estate –
Claim form –
Claim in bankruptcy –
Claimant –
Class –
Class action –
Class action suit –
Clean hands doctrine –
Cleanup clause –
Clear and convincing evidence –
Clear and present danger –
Clear title –
Clerk –
Close corporation –
Closed shop –
Closing –
Closing argument –
Cloud on title –
Co-trustee –
Code –
Code of Hammurabi –
Code of professional responsibility –
Codefendant –
Codex –
Codicil –
Codification –
Codify –
Coercion –
Cohabitation –
Cohabitation agreement –
Coinsurance –
Collateral –
Collateral attack –
Collateral descendant –
Collateral estoppel –
Collateral Warranty –
Collective agreement –
Collective bargaining agreement –
Collective rights –
Collective trade marks – –
Collusion –
Collusive action –
Color of law –
Color of title –
Comaker –
Comity –
Commencement of action –
Commentaries on the Laws of England –
Commercial frustration –
Commercial law –
Commingling –
Commission of rebellion -
Commissioner of oaths –
Committal –
Commodity status of animals –
Common area –
Common carrier –
Common counts –
Common law –
Common property –
Common purpose –
Common stock –
Common-law marriage –
Commons –
Community patent –
Community property –
Commutation –
Company –
Company seal –
Comparative law –
Comparative negligence –
Comparative responsibility –
Compensatory damages –
Competence –
Complainant –
Complaint –
Complete contract –
Compound interest –
Compound question –
Compounding a felony –
Compounding treason –
Compromise –
Compromise verdict –
Concealed weapon –
Conciliation –
Conclusion of fact –
Conclusion of law –
Concubinage –
Concurrent sentence –
Concurrent sentences –
Concurrent writ –
Condemnation action –
Condition precedent –
Condition subsequent –
Conditional bequest –
Conditional discharge –
Conditional dismissal –
Conditional sale –
Condominium –
Conduct money –
Confession (law) –
Confession and avoidance –
Confession of judgment –
Confidence game –
Confidential communication –
Confidential information –
Confidentiality –
Confiscate –
Conflict of interest –
Conflict of law –
Conflict of laws –
Confucianism –
Confusingly similar –
Congregation for the Doctrine of the Faith –
Congressional-executive agreement –
Conscientious objector –
Conscious parallelism –
Conscription –
Consecutive sentence –
Consecutive sentences –
Counsul of Force –
Countries banning non-human ape experimentation –
Consensu –
Consensual crime –
Consensus –
Consensus ad idem –
Consensus decision-making –
Consent –
Consent decree –
Consent judgment –
Consequential damages –
Consequentialism –
Conservatee –
Conservative Judaism –
Conservator (law) –
Consideration –
Consign –
Consignee –
Consignment –
Consortium –
Conspiracy –
Conspirator –
Constable –
Constitution –
Constitution of the Confederate States –
Constitution of France –
Constitution of Spain –
Constitutional amendment –
Constitutional charter –
Constitutional Convention (Australia) –
Constitutional Convention (United States) –
Constitutional law –
Constitutional monarchy –
Constitutional rights –
Construction –
Constructive –
Constructive dismissal –
Constructive eviction –
Constructive fraud –
Constructive notice –
Constructive possession –
Constructive trust –
Construe –
Consuetudinary –
Consultancy –
Consultant –
Consumer protection –
Contact –
Contemplation of death –
Contempt of court –
Contingency –
Contingency fee –
Contingent beneficiary –
Contingent fee –
Contingent interest –
Contingent remainder –
Continuance –
Continuing objection –
Continuing trespass –contra bonos mores –contra legem –
Contraband –
Contract –
Contract (canon law) –
Contract of adhesion –
Contract of sale –
Contract theory –
Contractor –Contramandatio placiti -
Contributory negligence –
Controlled substance –
Controlling law –
Controversy –
Conversion –
Conveyancing –
Convict –
Conviction –
Cooperative –
Cooperative housing –
Cop a plea –
Copartner –
Copyhold –
Copyleft –
Copyright –
Copyright infringement –
Copyright law of the European Union –
Copyright misuse –coram nobis –coram non judice –
Coroner –
Corporate governance –
Corporate haven –
Corporate opportunity –
Corporate personhood –
Corporate state –
Corporation –
Corporations law –corpus delicti –corpus juris –corpus juris civilis –corpus juris secundum –
Correlative rights doctrine –
Corroborate –
Corroborating evidence –
Corroboration –
Cost bill –
Cotenancy –
Cotenant –
Council Tax –
Counsel –
Counsellor –
Count –
Counter offer –
Counterclaim –
Counterfeit –
County court –
Coup d'état –
Cour de cassation –
Course of employment –
Court –
Court calendar –
Court costs –
Court docket –
Court of appeal –
Court of Appeal of England and Wales –
Court of Appeal (France) –
Court of Appeals –
Court of customs and patent appeals –
Court of equity –
Court of last resort –
Court of law –
Court of protection –
Court of record –
Court of Session –
Court order –
Court trial –
Court-martial –
Courtesy –
Courtroom –
Courts of England and Wales –
Courts of the United Kingdom –
Covenant (law) –
Covenant not to compete –
Covenant that runs with the land –
Covenants, conditions and restrictions –
Creature of statute –
Credibility –
Credible witness –
Creditor –
Creditor's claim –
Creditor's rights –
Crime –
Crime against humanity –
Crime against nature –
Crime against peace –
Crime of passion –
Criminal –
Criminal attorney –
Criminal calendar –
Criminal conversion –
Criminal justice –
Criminal law –
Criminal negligence –
Criminal procedure –
Critical legal studies –
Cross examination –
Cross-complaint –
Cross-examination –
Crown copyright –
Crown corporation –
Crown Court –
Crown entity –
Crown land –
Cruel and unusual punishment –
Cruelty –
Cruelty to animals –cui bono –cuius regio, eius religio –
Culpability –
Cumis counsel –
Cumulative sentence (disambiguation) –
Cumulative voting –
Curfew –
Customary estate –
Customary law –
Customs –custos morum –
Cut a check –
Cy pres doctrine –
Cyber law –
Cybersquatting

D
D.A. –
D.B.A. –
D.U.I. –
D.W.I. –
Damages –
Damnation –
Dangerous weapon –
Data protection –
Date rape –
Daubert standard –
Day in court –de bonis asportatis –de bonis non administratis –de facto –
De facto corporation –de futuro –de integro –de jure –
De jure corporation –de lege ferenda –de lege lata –de minimis –de novo –
Deadlock –
Deadlock provision –
Deadly weapon –Death tax –
Death penalty –
Death row –
Death duty –
Debenture –
Debt –
Debt bondage –
Debtor –
Debtor in possession –
Decapitation –
Deceased –
Deceit –
Deception –
Decide! –
Decision –
Decisory oath -
Declarant –
Declaration of Arbroath –
Declaration of independence –
Declaration of mailing –
Declaration of the Independence of New Zealand –
Declaration of the Rights of Man and of the Citizen –
Declaration of trust –
Declaration of war –
Declaration of war by the United States –
Declaratory judgment –
Declaratory relief –
Declared death in absentia –
Decree –
Decree absolute –
Decree nisi –
Decriminalization –
Dedication –
Deduction –
Deed –
Deed poll –defalcation –
Defamation –
Default (law) –
Default judgment –
Default rule –
Defeasance –
Defective title –
Defendant –
Defense –
Defense attorney – –
Defense of infancy –
Deficiency judgment –
Defined benefit plan –
Defined contribution plan –
Deforce –
Defraud –
Degree of kinship –
Deliberate –
Deliberation –
Deliberative body –
Delict –
Demand –
Demand note –
Demesne –
Demise –
Democracy –
Demonstrative evidence –
Demurrer –
Denial –
Deobandi –
Deontology –
Department for Constitutional Affairs –
Dependent –
Deportation –
Deposition –
Depreciate –
Depreciation –
Depreciation reserve –
Derivative action –
Derivative work –
Derivatives law -
Descent and distribution –
Desert –
Desertion –
Destructibility of contingent remainders –
Detailed Assessment –
Devi –
Devil's Advocate –
Devisee –
Devolution –
Devolve –
Devolved government –dicta –dictum –
Digital signature –
Diligence –
Diminished capacity –
Diminished responsibility –
Diminished responsibility in English law –
Diminution in value –
Diplomatic immunity –
Diplomatic recognition –
Direct and proximate cause –
Direct evidence –
Direct examination –
Directed verdict –
Directors register –
Disability –
Disbar –
Disbarment –
Discharge in bankruptcy –
Disciplinary procedure –
Disclaimer –
Discovery –
Discovery of documents –
Discretion –
Discretionary trust –
Discrimination –
Disembowelment –
Disfigure –
Dishonor –
Disinheritance –
Disjunctive allegations –
Dismissal –
Dismissal with prejudice –
Dismissal without prejudice –
Disobbedienti –
Disorderly conduct –
Disorderly house – –
Disposing mind and memory –
Disposition –
Dispossess –
Dispute resolution –
Dissent –
Dissenting opinion –
Dissolution (law) –
Dissolution of corporation –
Dissolution of the Monasteries –
Distinguish –
Distribute –
Distribution of property –
Distributive justice –
District attorney –
District court –
Diversity of citizenship –
Divestiture –
Divestment –
Dividend –
Dividend tax –
Divine Right of Kings –
Division of property –
Divisional court (disambiguation) –
Divorce –
DNA –
Document –
Documentary evidence –
Doctrine of exoneration of liens –doli incapax –
Domestic partner –
Domestic partners –
Domestic relations –
Domestic violence –
Dominant estate –
Dominant tenement –Donatio mortis causa –
Donation –
Donative intent –
Donee –
Doom book –
Double jeopardy –
Double taxation –
Dower –
Dowry –
Draft document –
Drainage law –
Dram shop rule –
Drawer –
Drawing and quartering –
Dreyfus affair –
Driver's license –
Driving under the influence –
Driving while intoxicated –
Droit du seigneur –
Drop dead date –
Drug –
Dubitante –duces tecum –
Due and owing –
Due care –
Due diligence –
Due process –
Due process of law –
Due, owing and unpaid –
Duress –
Duress in English law –
Duty –
Duty of care –
Duty of care in English law –
Duty to warn –
Dying declaration

E
Early Muslim philosophy –
Earned income tax credit –
Earnest payment –
Easement –
Ecclesia –
Ecclesiastical court –
Ecumenical council –
Edict –
Edict of Fontainebleau –
Edict of Milan –
Edict of Nantes –
Edict of Worms –ei incumbit probatio qui –
Either –
Ejectment –ejusdem generis –
Elder law –
Election of remedies –
Election under the will –
Elective share –
Electoral reform –
Electric chair –
Emancipation –
Emancipation Proclamation –
Embezzlement –
Embezzler –
Emblements –
Emergency –
Eminent domain –
Emolument –
Employee –
Employer –
Employers' liability –
Employment –
Employment contract –
Employment law –
En banc –
Enabling clause –
Enclosure –
Encumbrance –
End user license agreement –
Endowment –
Enfeoff –
Enfeoffment –
Enforcement –
English Bill of Rights –
English law –
Enjoin –
Enjoyment –
Enrolled Bill doctrine –
Entail –
Enter a judgment –
Entertainment law –
Entity –
Entrapment –
Entry of judgment –
Environmental Impact Report –
Environmental impact statement –
Environmental law –
Ephebophilia –
Equal Access Act –
Equal opportunity –
Equal Protection Clause –
Equitable distribution –
Equitable estoppel –
Equitable lien –
Equitable remedy –
Equity (law) –
Equity of redemption –
Equivalent –erga omnes –erratum –
Error –
Escalator clause –
Escape clause –
Escheat –
Escrow –
Escrow account –
Escrow agent –
Escrow instructions –
Espionage –
Esquire –
Essential facilities doctrine –
Establishment clause –
Estate –
Estate by entirety –
Estate in land –
Inheritance tax –estoppel –et al. –et cetera –et seq –
Eternity clause
Ethical calculus –
Ethical code –
Ethics –
Ethics in religion –
Ethnic cleansing –
EU Directive 2010/63/EU –
European Convention on Human Rights –
European Court of Human Rights –
European Court of Justice –
European Patent Convention –
European Patent Organisation –
European Union directive –
Directive (EU) –
European Union Law –
European Union regulation –
Regulation (EU) –
Euthanasia –
Evasion of tax –
Evasion of the law –
Eviction –
Evidence –ex aequo et bono –ex cathedra –ex delicto –ex facie –ex gratia –ex officio –ex parte –ex post facto –
Ex post facto law –ex rel –
Examination –
Exception in deed –
Excessive bail –
Excise –
Exclusionary rule –
Excommunication –
Exculpatory –
Excusable neglect –
Excuse –
Execution –
Execution –
Execution warrant –
Executioner –
Executive –
Executive clemency –
Executive privilege –
Executor –
Executory contract –
Executory interest –executrix –
Exegesis –
Exemplary damages –
Exempt –
Exempt employees –
Exempt property –
Exemption –
Exhibit –
exigent circumstances –
Exile –
Expectancy –
Expense –
Expert determination –
Expert testimony –
Expert witness –
Express contract –
Express warranty –
Extension –
Extenuating circumstances –
Extinguishment –
Extortion –
Extradition –
Extrajudicial –
Extraordinary General Meeting –
Extraordinary resolution –
Extreme cruelty –
Extrinsic fraud

F
FOB (shipping) –
Fabricate –
Fabula –
Face –
Facere –
Facies –
Facile –
Fact –
Facto –
Factory –
Factum –
Faculties, Court of –
Faculty (instrument) –
Faculty of a college – –
Faculty of Advocates –
Faggot voter –
Fail –
Failure –
Failure of consideration –
Failure of issue –
Faint action –
Fair –
Fair Play Men –
Fair pleader –
Faith –
Faithless servant –
Falang –
Falda –
Faldstool –
Falesia –
Falk-land –
False action –
False imprisonment –
False pretenses –
False swearing –
Falsehood –
Falsify –
Falsing –
Falsum –
Falsus in uno, falsus in omnibus –
Familia –
Family –
Famosus –
Famosus libelus –
Fanatics –
Fakir –
Farm –
Farmer –
Faro –
Farrier –
Fasti –
Father –
Father-in-law –
Fathom –
Fatuity –
Fatuus –
Faubourg –
Fautor –
Fealty –
Fear –
Feciales –
Federal government –
Fee –
Fee-simple –
Fenian –
Feodal –
Feodal system –
Feodary –
Feodum –
Feoffee –
Feoffment –
Feoh –
Feria –
Feriae –
Ferling –
Ferry –
Ferryman –
Feu (land tenure) –
Feud –
Fishing law –
Flag –
Flag of the United States –
Flagrante delicto –
Flem –
Fleta –
Flight –
Floating capital –
Floor –
Florin –
Flotsam –
Fluctus –
Face amount –
Face value –
Fact –
Factum –
Faculty of law –
Failure of consideration –
Failure of issue –
Fair comment –
Fair dealing –
Fair market value –
Fair trade laws –
Fair use –
Fairness Doctrine –
False arrest –
False Claims Law –
False imprisonment –
False pretenses –
Family –
Family law –
Family court –
Family law –
Family patrimony –
Family purpose doctrine –
Fatwa –
Fault auto insurance system –
Federal Communications Commission –
Federal Constitutional Court (Germany) –
United States federal courts –
Federal judge –
Federal jurisdiction (United States) –
Federal law –
Federal question –
Federal tort claims act –
Federalism –
Fee –
Fee simple –
Fee tail –
Felicific calculus –
Felony –
Felonious –
Felony –
Felony murder rule –
Feme covert –
Feoff –
Feoffee –
Feoffment –
Fertile octogenarian –
Feud –
Feudal land tenure –
Feudal system –
Feudalism –
Fictitious defendants –fiduciary –
Fiduciary duty –
Fiduciary relationship –
Fief –
Fieri –fieri facias –
Fighting words –
File –
Final judgment –
Finder of fact –
Findings of fact –
Fine –
Fiqh –
Firm offer –
First degree murder –
First impression –
First to file and first to invent –
Fixture –
Fixtures –
Flight –
Floating charge –
Floating easement –
FOB –
Fostering –
Foujdar –
Four corners –
Fourierism –
Fox's Libel Act –
Frais –
Franc –
Francia –
Francus –
Frank-marriage –
Franking privilege –
Fraternity –
Fratricide –
Fraud –
Fraus –
Fraxinetum –
Free-bench –
Free and clear –
Free socage –
Free warren –
Freedman –
Freedom –
Freedom of speech –
Freedom of the press –
Free on board –
Freight –
Freighter –
Frenchman –
Frequent –
Frere –
Fresca –
Fresh pursuit –
Fretum Britannicum –
Friend of the court –
Friendly societies –
Friendly suit –
Frigidity –
Frith –
Frontage –
Frontier –
Fructus industriales –
Fructus naturales –
Fruges –
Fruit –
Folkways –
For value received –
Forbearance –
Force majeure –
Forced heirship –
Forced sale –
Forcible entry –
Foreclosure –
Foreclosure sale –
Foreign corporation –
Forensic –
Forensic medicine –
Forensic testimony –
Forensics –
Foreseeability –
Foreseeable risk –
Forfeit –
Forger –
Forgery –
Formal contract –
Fornication –forum conveniens –forum non conveniens –
Forum shopping –
Foster child –
Four Cardinal Virtues –
Four corners of an instrument –
Franc-tireur –
Franchise –
Franchise tax –
Franchising –
Fraud –
Fraud in the inducement –
Fraudulent conveyance –
Fraudulent trading –
Free and clear –
Free economic zone –
Free on board –
Free port –
Free software license –
Free speech –
Free will –
Freedom of assembly –
Freedom of association –
Freedom of expression –
Freedom of Information Act –
Freedom of religion –
Freedom of speech –
Freedom of speech by country –
Freedom of the press –
Freedom of thought –
Freehold –
French law on secularity and conspicuous religious symbols in schools –
Fresh pursuit –
Friendly suit –
Frisking –
Frivolous lawsuit –
Fructus naturales –
Fruit of the poisonous tree –
Frustration of purpose –
Fugitive from justice –
Full faith and credit –
Fully paid –functus officio –
Fundamental justice –
Fundamentalism –
Fungible things –
Future interest –
Futuwa –
Fyrd

G
Gag order –
Gallows –
Game law –
Gaps and gores –
Garnish –
Garnishee –
Garnishment –
Gas chamber –
Gasoline tax –
Gemara –
Gender bias –
General Agreement on Tariffs and Trade –
General appearance –
General assignment –
General Counsel –
General damages –
General denial –
General meeting –
General order –
General partnership –
General plan –
General strike –
General Synod –
Generation skipping –
Geneva Conventions –
Genocide –
German town law –
Gibbet –
Gift –
Gift in contemplation of death –
Gift tax –
Glasnost –
Go bail –
Going concern –
Good cause –
Good faith –
Good governance –
Good samaritan rule –
Good title –
Goods –
Goseibai Shikimoku –
Government –
Government-granted monopoly –
Governmental immunity –
Grace period –
Grand Inquisitor –
Grand jury –
Grand larceny –
Grand theft –
Grandfather clause –
Grandfathered in –
Grandparent visitation –
Grant –
Grant deed –
Grantor-grantee index –
Gratuitous –gravamen –
Great Ape Project –
Green card –
Gross income –
Gross negligence –
Grounds for divorce –
Group boycott –
Group litigation order –
Guanxi –
Guarantee –
Guarantees –
Guarantor –
Guaranty –
Guardian –
Guardian ad litem –
Guest statute –
Guild –
Guillotine –
Guilt –
Guilty

H

Habeas corpus –
Habeas corpus ad deliberandum et recipiendum –
Habeas corpus ad faciendum et recipiendum –
Habeas corpus ad prosequendum –
Habeas corpus ad respondendum –
Habeas corpus ad satisfaciendum –
Habeas corpus ad subjiciendum –
Habeas corpus ad testificandum –
Habeas corpus cum causa –
Habitant –
Habitation (see Dwelling) –
Habitual Criminals Act –
Hable –
Hacienda –
Habitable – –
Habitual criminal –
Hadith –
Hague Convention –
Hague-Visby Rules –
Halaal –
Halakha (Jewish law) –
Jewish law (Halakha) –
Half blood –
Halsbury's Laws of England –
Hanafi –
Hanbali –
Hanging –
Haram –
Harass –
Harassment –
Harm reduction –
Harmless error –
Hate speech –
Head of household –
Headnote –
Headright –
Heads of loss -
Health care proxy –
Hearing –
Hearsay –
Hearsay rule –
Heat of passion –
Heir –
Heir apparent –
Heiress –
Heirs –
Heirs of the body –
Hell or high water clause –
Hereditament –
Herem (censure) –
Herem (priestly gift) –
Herem (war or property) –
Heresy –
Hidden asset –
High court judge –
High Court of Australia –
Royal High Court of Bhutan –
High Court of Justice (England and Wales) –
Court of High Commission (ecclesiastical court in England) –
High Court of Fiji –
High Court (Hong Kong) –
High Courts of India, several courts –
High Court (Ireland) –
High Court (Isle of Man) –
High Court of Malaya –
High Court of New Zealand –
High Court of Cassation and Justice (Romania) –
High Court of Justiciary (Scotland) –
High Court of Sabah and Sarawak –
High Court of Singapore –
High Court of South Africa –
Highway –
Highwayman –
Hima –
Himalaya clause –
Hit and run –
Hobby loss –
Hold harmless –
Holder in due course –
Holding –
Holding company –
Holdover tenancy –
Holographic will –
Home Rule –
Home Secretary –
Homestead Act –
Homestead exemption –
Homestead principle –
Hometowned –
Homicide –
Hong Kong trademark law –
Hornbook law –
Hostile environment sexual harassment –
Hostile possession –
Hostile witness –
Hot pursuit –
Hotch-pot –
House counsel –
House of Lords –
Household –
Housing tenure –
Human rights –
Human Rights Committee –
Human rights issues in the United States –
Humanism –
Hung jury –
Hunting Act 2004 –
Hypothecate

I
Idea-expression divide –idem –ignorantia juris non excusat –
Ijma –
Ijtihad –
Illegal combatant –
Illegal drug trade –
Illegal immigrant –
Illegitimacy –
Illusory promise –
Ilm ar-Rijal –
Imam –
Immediately –
Immigrant visa –
Immigration –
Immigration Appellate Authority –
Immunity –
Impanel –
Impaneling –
Impeach –
Impeachment –
Impleader –
Implied Bill of Rights –
Implied consent –
Implied contract –
Implied covenant of good faith and fair dealing –
Implied terms –
Implied warranty –
Implied warranty of fitness for a particular purpose –
Implied warranty of habitability –
Implied warranty of merchantability –
Importation right –
Impossibility –
Impotence –
Imputation –in camera –
In chambers –in curia –in delicto –in esse –
In fee simple –in flagrante delicto –in forma pauperis –in haec verba –
In kind –
In lieu –in limine –in loco parentis –in pari delicto –in personam –
in pro per –in prope persona –in propria persona –in re –in rem –in situ –in terrorem –in terrorem clause –in toto –
Incapacity –
Incest –
Inchoate offense –
Incidental beneficiary –
Income –
Income tax –
Incompetent evidence –
Incontrovertible evidence –
Incorporation (business) –
Incorporate by reference –
Incorporation (business) –
Incorporeal –
Incriminate –
Incumbrance –
Indecent exposure –
Indefeasible –
Indefeasible estate –
Indemnify –
Indemnity –
Indenture –
Indentured servant –
Independent contractor –
Indeterminacy debate in legal theory –
Indeterminate sentence –
Indictable offence –
Indictable offense –
Indictment –
Indigent –
Indispensable party –
Individual capital –
Individual rights –
Indorse –
Industrial design rights –
Industrial tribunal –
Infancy –
Infant –
Infanticide Act –
Inference –
Information –
Information and belief –
Informed consent –
Infraction –
Infractions –
Infringement –
Ingress –
Inherit –
Inheritance –
Inheritance tax –
Injunction –
Injunctive relief –
Injury –
Inkan –
Innocence –
Innocent –
Inns of Court –innuendo –
Inquest –
Inquisition –
Inquisitor –
Inquisitorial system –
Insanity –
Insanity defense –
Insider trading –
Insolvency –
Insolvent –
Inspection of documents –
Installment contract –
Instruction –
Instructional capital –
Insufficient evidence –
Insurance –
Insured –
Insurer –
Intangible property –
Integrated criminal justice information system –
Integration –
Intellectual capital –
Intellectual property –
Intellectual rights –
Intendant of New France –
Intent –inter alia –inter se –inter vivos –
Inter vivos trust –
Interest –
Interference proceeding –
Interim order –
Interlineation –interlocutory –
International Business Companies Act –
Interlocutory decree –
Interlocutory order –
Intermediate sanctions –
Internal affairs doctrine –
International Business Companies Act –
International constitutional law –
International Court of Justice –
International Covenant on Civil and Political Rights –
International crime –
International Criminal Court –
International Criminal Tribunal for Rwanda –
International Criminal Tribunal for the Former Yugoslavia –
International environmental law –
International human rights instruments –
International human rights law –
International law –
International relations –
International trade –
International trade law –
Internment –
Interpleader –
Interrogation –
Interrogatories –
Interstate commerce –
Intertemporal Law –
Intervene –
Intervening cause –
Intervention –
Intestacy –
Intestate –
Intestate succession –
Intoxication –intra fauces terra –intra vires –
Intrinsic fraud –
Inure –
Invasion of privacy –
Inventor –
Inventor's notebook –
Inverse condemnation –
Invest –
Investiture –
Investment –
Invitation to treat –
Invitee –
Involuntary commitment –ipse dixit –ipsissima verba –ipso facto –
Irreconcilable differences –
Irrelevant –
Irreparable damage or injury –
Irresistible impulse –
Islamic Law (Sharia) –
Sharia (Islamic law) –
Islamic philosophy –
Isnad –
Issue –
Issue preclusion –
Issued shares

J
Juris Doctor (J.D.) –
Jafari –
Jane Doe –
Jaywalking –
Jeopardy –
Jewish principles of faith –
Jewish Theological Seminary of America –
Jim Crow laws –
John Doe –
Joinder –
Joinder of issue –
Joint –
Joint adventure –
Joint and several –
Joint and several liability –
Joint custody –
Joint liability –
Joint property –
Joint tenancy –
Joint tortfeasors –
Joint venture –
Jointure –
Jones act –
Journeyman –
Joyride –
Judge –
Judge advocate –
Judge Advocate General –
Judgment –
Judgment by default –
Judgment debtor –
Judgment in Berlin –
Judgment non obstante veredicto –
Judgment notwithstanding the verdict –
Judgment notwithstanding verdict –
Judicial –
Judicial Committee of the Privy Council –
Judicial discretion –
Judicial economy –
Judicial foreclosure –
Judicial functions of the House of Lords –
Judicial independence –
Judicial interference –
Judicial notice –
Judicial review –
Jump bail –
Junior barrister –jurat –
Jurisdiction –
Jurisdictional amount –
Jurisprudence –
Jurist –
Juror –
Jury –
Jury box –
Jury charge –
Jury fees –
Jury instructions –
Jury nullification –
Jury of one's peers –
Jury panel –
Jury selection –
Jury stress –
Jury tampering –
Jury trial –jus ad bellum –jus ad bellum –jus civile –jus cogens –jus commune –jus gentium –jus inter gentes –jus naturale –jus primae noctis –jus sanguines –jus sanguinis –jus soli –
Just cause –
Just compensation –
Just war –
Justice –
Justice of the Peace –
Justiciable –
Justifiable homicide –
Justification –
Juvenile –
Juvenile court –
Juvenile delinquent

K
Kangaroo court –
Karaites –
Karma –
Kosher law –
Kellogg-Briand Pact –
Kidnapping –
King's Bench –
Kinshasa Declaration on Great Apes –
Know-how –
Kollel

L
Labor and materials –
Labor law –
labor union –
Laches –lacunae –
Land use –
Land value tax –
Landlady –
Landlocked –
Landlord –
Landlord and tenant –
Landlord and Tenant Act –
Landlord's lien –
Lapse –
Larceny –
Last antecedent rule –
Last clear chance –
Last will and testament –
Latent defect –
Law –
Law and economics –
Law and literature –
Law and motion calendar –
Law basic topics –
Law book –
Law dictionary –
Law French –
Law lords –
Law of admiralty –
Law of Canada –
Law of costs –
Law of Ireland –
Law library –
Law of obligations –
Law of the case –
Law of the land –
Law of the Russian Federation –
Law of the Sea –
Law of the Soviet Union –
Law of the United Kingdom –
Law of the United States –
Law of treaties –
Law school –
Law Society –
Laws of war –
Lawsuit –
Lawyer –
Lay a foundation –
Lay assessor –
Laïcité –
Leading question –
Leading the witness –
Lease –
Lease and release –
Leasehold –
Legal –
Legal abuse –
Legal action –
Legal advertising –
Legal age –
Legal aid –
Legal Aid Society –
Legal code –
Legal consequences of marriage and civil partnership in the United Kingdom –
Legal custody –
Legal debate –
Legal dualism –
Legal entity –
Artificial person –
Legal fiction –
Legal formalism –
Legal history –
Legal instrument –
Legal Latin –
Legal lexicography –
Legal personal representative –
Legal positivism –
Legal pluralism –
Legal realism –
Legal separation –
Legal status of animals in Canada –
Legal technicality –
Legal tender –
Legal translation –
Legalese –
Legalism (Western philosophy) –
Legalism (Chinese philosophy) –
Legalism (theology) –
Legalization –
Legatee –
Legislation –
Legislature –
Legitimacy (family law) –
Legitimacy (political science) –legitime –
Lemon law –
Lessee –
Lesser crime –
Lesser included offenses –
Lesser-included offense –
Let –
Lethal injection –
Letter of credit –
Letter of marque –
Letter of wishes –
Letters –
Letters of administration –
Letters patent –
Letters testamentary –
Leverage –
Leviticus –lex lata –lex scripta –
Liable –
Libel –
Libel per se –
Libertarian theories of law –
Liberty –
Licence –
License –
Licensee –
Lie detector test –
Lien –
Lienor –
Life –
Life estate –
Life without possibility of parole –
Limitation of actions –
Limitations clause, Constitution of Canada –
Limited company –
Limited jurisdiction –
Limited liability –
Limited liability company –
Limited partner –
Limited partnership –
Line of succession –
Lineal descendant –
Lineup –
Liquidate –
Liquidated damages –
Liquidation –
Liquidator (law) –lis pendens –
List of Roman laws –
Listed building –
Literary property –
Litigant –
Litigation –
Litigious –
Liturgy –
Livery –
Livery of seizin –living trust –
Living will –
LL.B. –
LL.M. –
Loanshark –
Lockout –locus delicti –locus in quo –
Loiter (law) –
Long cause –
Long vacation –
Long-arm statute –
Lord Chancellor –
Lord Chancellor's Department –
Lord Chief Justice –
Lord Chief Justice of England and Wales –
Lord Justice General –
Lord Justice of appeal –
Lord Keeper of the Great Seal –
Lord President of the Council –
Lord Steward –
Loss of consortium –
Loss of use –
Lost volume seller –
Lower court –
Lübeck law

M
M'Naghten Rules –
Madhhab –
Madrassa –
Magdeburg rights –
Magdeburg law –
Magistrate –
Magna Carta –
Mail box rule –
Maim –
Maintenance –
Maintenance –
Maintenance –
Majority –
Mala fides –male fide –
Malfeasance –
Malice aforethought –
Malicious prosecution –
Maliki –
Malpractice –malum in se –malum prohibitum –mandamus –
Writ of mandamus –
Mandate (criminal law) –
Mandate (international law) –
Mandate of Heaven –
Mandatory joinder –
Mandatory sentence –
Mann act –
Manorialism –
Manslaughter –
Manslaughter in English law –
Manumission –
Manusmriti –mare clausum –mare liberum –
Marital deduction –
Marital life estate –
Marital rights –
Maritime law –
Marked for identification –
Market value –
Marketable title –
Marriage –
Marriageable age –
Marshal –
Martial law –
Mask work –
Masoretes –
Masoretic Text –
Masorti –
Massachusetts trust –
Master –
Master and servant –
Master of Laws –
Master of the Rolls –
Master of the Rolls in Ireland –
Materiality –
Material witness –
Matrimonial regime –
Matter –
Maturity –
Maxims –
Maxims of equity –
Maxims of law –
May –
Mayhem –
Mechanic's lien –
Mechanics lien –
Mediation –
Mediator –
Medical directive –
Medical ethics –
Medieval Inquisition –
Meet and confer –
Meeting of the minds –
Meforshim –
Megan's Law –
Memorandum –
Memorandum of Association –mens rea –
Mental cruelty –
Mental health law –
Mental suffering –
Mercantile law –
Merchantable –
Merger –
Mesne –mesne assignment –
Mesne profits –
Messuage –
Metes and bounds –
Military alliance –
Military dictatorship –
Military law –
Military tribunal –
Militia –
Mining claim –
Ministerial act –
minor –
Minutes –
Miranda warning –
Mirror wills –
Misappropriation –
Mischief –
Misdemeanor –
Misfeasance –
Mishnah Berurah –
Mishnah –
Hebrew law (Mishpat Ivri) –
Mishpat Ivri (Hebrew law) –
Misjoinder –
Misnomer –
Misprision of a felony –
Misprision of treason –
Misrepresentation –
Mistake of law –
Mistrial –
Mitigating circumstances –
Mitigating factors –
Mitzvah –
Mock trial –
Modern Islamic philosophy –modus operandi –
Moiety title –
Monarch –
Money laundering –
Monopoly –
Monopoly on the legitimate use of physical force –
Month-to-month –
Monument –
Moot court –
Moot point –
Mootness –
Mopery –
Moral absolutism –
Moral certainty –
Moral code –
Moral core –
Moral relativism –
Moral rights –
Moral turpitude –
Moral universalism –
Morality –
Moratorium –
Mores –
Morganatic marriage –
Mortgage law –
Mortgagee –
Mortgagor –
Motion –
Motion for a summary judgment –
Motion for more definite statement –
Motion for directed verdict –
Motion for dismissal –
Motion for summary judgment –motion in limine –
Motion to dismiss –
Motion to Strike –
Motion to suppress –
Motion to suppress evidence –
Motive –
Motor vehicle exception--Motor vehicle theft –
Movant –
Mujtahid –
Mullah –
Multiple citizenship –
Multiplicity of suits –
Municipal –
Muniment of title –
Murder –
Murder in English law –
Muslim dietary laws –
Mutation –mutatis mutandis –
Mutiny –
Mutual wills

N
N.O.V. –
Name change –
Named plaintiffs –
Napoleonic code –
Narcotic –
National Insurance contributions –
National Labor Relations Board –
National trade union center –
Nationality –
Natural law –
Natural person –
Natural resource law –ne exeat –
Necessary party –
Negative pledge –
Negative pregnant –
Negligence –
Negligence per se –
Negligent –
Negotiable instrument –
Negotiation –nemo dat quod non habet –nemo judex in sua causa –
Neutral country –
Next friend –
Next of kin –
Night and Fog prisoner –nihil dicit –nisi prius –
No contest –
No fault divorce –
No fault insurance –
No-par stock –
Noble Eightfold Path –nolle prosequi –nolo contendere –
Nominal damages –
Nominal party –
Nominal value –
Nominee –non compos mentis –non constat –non est factum –non liquet –non obstante verdicto –
Non-binding arbitration –
Non-conforming use –
Non-contestability clause –
Non-disclosure agreement –
Non-executive director –
Non-feasance –
Non-profit corporation –
Non-profit organization –
Non-suit –
Nonimmigrant visa –
Nonviolence –
Not guilty –
Not guilty by reason of insanity –
Not-for-profit corporation –nota bene –
Notary public –
Notice –
Notice of appeal –
Notice of default –
Notice to quit –
Notorious possession –
Notwithstanding clause (Canadian Constitution) –
Novation –
Nuisance –nulla bona –nulla poena sine lege –
Nullity (conflict) –nullum crimen, nulla poena sine praevia lege poenali –nunc pro tunc –
Nuremberg Code –
Nuremberg Trials

O
O.R. –
O.S.C. –
Oath –obiter dicta is plural; see the singular obiter dictum –
Object –
Objectivist philosophy –
Obligation –
Obligations of confidentiality –
Obligee –
Obligor –
Obscene –
Obscenity –
Obstruction of justice –
Occupancy –
Occupant –
Occupational disease –
Occupational hazard –
Occupy the field –
Of counsel –
Offender –
Offer of proof –
Offeree –
Offeror –
Officer of the court –
Officers of a corporation –
Official –
Official misconduct –
Official receiver –
Official Solicitor –
Officious intermeddler –
Offshore corporation –
Ombudsman –
Omission –
Omnibus clause –
On all fours –onus probandi –
Open adoption –
Open court –
Open-source license –
Opening statement –
Operation of law –opinio juris sive necessitatis –
Opinion –
Oppression remedy –
Oral argument –
Oral contract –
Oral examination –
Oral law –
Order –
Order in Council –
Order to show cause –
Ordinary (officer) –
Ordinary course of business –
Ordinary resolution –
Ordinary shares –
Organized crime –
Original jurisdiction –
Original sin –
Originating application –
Orphan –
Ostensible agent –
Ostensible authority –
Out of court –
Out-of-pocket expenses –
Outlaw –
Output contract –
Over-the-counter drug –
Overcharge –
Overt act –
Owe –
Own –
Own recognizance –
Owner –
Owner-occupier –
Ownership

Ppacta sunt servanda –
Pain and suffering –
Palimony –
Panderer –par delictum –
Paralegal –
Paramount title –
Paraphilia –
Pardon –parens patriae –
Parent –
Parent company –
Pari delicto –
Pari passu –
Paris Convention for the Protection of Industrial Property –
Parish –
Parliament –
Parliamentary procedure –
Parliamentary supremacy –
Parliamentary system –
Parody –
Parol –
Parol evidence rule –
Parole –
Parquet –
Partial breach –
Partial verdict –
Particulars –
Partition –
Partner –
Partnership –
Party –
Party of the first part –
Party of the second part –
Party wall –
Passenger –
Passing off –
Patent –
Patent ambiguity –
Patent Cooperation Treaty –
Patent infringement –
Patent pending –
Patentability –
Patently unreasonable –
Paternity –
Paternity suit –
Patient –
Patrimony of affectation –
Patronage –
Pay as you earn (paye) –
Payable –
Payee –
Payor –
Peace bond –
Peaceable possession –
Peculation –
Pecuniary –
Pedophilia –
Peeping tom –
Peer group –
Peerage –
Peer review –
Penal code –
Penal colony –
Penal law –
Penal notice –
Penal transportation –
Penalty phase –
Penance –
Pendent jurisdiction –pendente lite –
Pension plan –
Pension scheme –
People's Republic of China's trademark law –per capita –per curiam –per diem –per minas –per pro –per quod –per stirpes –
Peremptory challenge –
Peremptory challenges –
Peremptory norm –
Peremptory writ of mandate –
Perfect –
Perfection (law) –
Perform –
Performance –
Perjurer –
Perjury –
Permanent Court of Arbitration –
Permanent injunction –
Permissive –
Perpetuity –
Person –
Person having ordinary skill in the art –persona non grata –
Personal effects –
Personal jurisdiction –
Personal property –
Personal recognizance –
Personal representative –
Personal service –
Personality rights –
Personalty –
Perversion –
Petit jury –
Petition –
Petition for probate –
Petition to make special –
Petitioner –
Petty larceny –
Petty offenses –
Philosophy of law –
Physical custody –
Physician-patient privilege –
Picketing –
Pierce the corporate veil –
Piercing the corporate veil –
Pilferage –
Pillory –
Pimp –
Piracy –
Plagiarism –
Plain error –
Plain view doctrine –
Plaint note –
Plaint number –
Plaintiff –
Plc –
Plea –
Plea bargain –
Plea in abatement –
Plead –
Pleading –
Pleadings –
Plenary authority –
Police –
Police brutality –
Police oppression –
Police powers (United States constitutional law) –
Police state –
Corruption –
Political prisoner –
Political question –
Political science –
Poll tax (disambiguation) –
Polyandry –
Polygamy –
Bigamy –
Polygraph –
Pornography –
Port of entry –
Positive law –
Possession –
Possession of stolen goods –
Possession proceedings –
Possessory –
Possessory interest –
Possibility of a reverter –post mortem –
Postdated check –
Pot –
Pour over will –
Poverty law –
Power –
Power of appointment –
Power of arrest –
Power of attorney –
Practice –
Practice Direction –
Practice of law –
Praemunire –praetor peregrinus –
Pre-emption rights –
Precedent –
Preemption of state and local laws in the United States –
Preemptive right –
Preference –
Preferential creditor –
Preferred dividend –
Preferred stock –
Pregnant denial –
Preliminary hearing –
Preliminary injunction –
Premeditation –
Premises –
Prenuptial agreement –
Preponderance of the evidence –
Prerogative writ –
Prescription drug –
Prescriptive easement –
President of the family division –
Presiding judge –
Presumption –
Presumption of innocence –
Pretermitted heir –
Pretrial discovery –
Price fixing –prima facie –
Prima facie case –
Prima impressionis –
Prime suspect –primogeniture –
Prior restraint –
Prison –
Prisoner of war –
Privacy –
Private bill –
Private carrier –
Private company –
Private Express Statutes –
Private international law –
Private law –
Private nuisance –
Private parts –
Private property –
Private road –
Privateer –
Privilege (evidence) –
Privilege (legal ethics) –
Privilege against self incrimination –
Privileged communication –
Privity –
Privy Council –
Privy Council of Sweden –pro bono –pro bono publico –pro forma –pro hac vice –pro per –pro se –pro tanto –pro tem –pro tempore –
Probable cause –
Probate –
Probation –
Probative –
Probative value –
Procedendo –
Procedural defense –
Procedural justice –
Procedural law –
Procedure –
Proceeding –
Process –
Process server –
Proctor –
Product liability –
Professional corporation –
Professional negligence –
Proffer –
Prohibition –
Writ of prohibition –
Promise –
Promissory estoppel –
Promissory note –
Property –
Property damage –
Property law –
Property tax –propria persona –
Proprietary rights –
Proprietor –
Prosecute –
Prosecution –
Prosecutor –
Prostitute –
Prostitution –
Protective custody –
Protective order –
Protest –
Protocol –
Provisional remedy –
Proximate cause –
Prudent man rule –
Public –
Public administrator –
Public benefit corporation –
Public company –
Public corporation (disambiguation) –
Public defender –
Public domain –
Public figure –
Public limited company –
Public nuisance –
Public order –
Public property –
Public record –
Public trust doctrine –
Public trustee –
Public use –
Public utility –
Publication –
Publici juris –
Publish –
Puffery –
Puisne judge –
Punitive damages –
Putative father –
Putative father registry

Qquaere –quantum meruit –
Quash –
Quasi community property –
Quasi contract –
Quasi corporation –
Quasi in rem –
Quasi-contract –
Quasi-criminal –
Quasi-delict –
Quasi-judicial –
Queen's bench –
Queen's Privy Council for Canada –
Queens bench division –
Queen's counsel –
Question of fact –
Question of law –qui tam action –quid pro quo –quid pro quo sexual harassment –
Quiet enjoyment –
Quiet title action –
Quitclaim deed –
Quitrent –quo warranto –
Quorum –
Quotient verdict –
Qur'an

R
Rabbi –
Rabbinic literature –
Rabbinical Assembly –
Race to the courthouse –
Racial discrimination –
Racial segregation –
Racism –
Racketeer influenced corrupt organization (RICO) statute –
Racketeering –
Radical transparency –
Ransom –
Rape –
Ratification –
Ratify –ratio decidendi –ratio scripta –
Rational basis –Ratum sed non consummatum –
Real estate –
Real estate investment trust –
Real party in interest –
Real property –
Realty –
Reasonable care –
Reasonable doubt –
Reasonable man doctrine –
Reasonable time – –
Reasonableness –
Rebbe –rebus sic stantibus –
Rebuttable presumption –
Rebuttal –
Recapture –
Receipt –
Receivership –
Recharacterisation –
Recidivist –
Reciprocal discovery –
Reckless –
Reckless disregard –
Reckless driving –
Recklessness –
Recognisance –
Reconstructionist Judaism –
Reconveyance –
Recorder –
Recording acts –
Recoupment –
Recover –
Recoverable –
Recusal –
Rectification (law) –
Recuse –
Redemption (bonds) –
Redemption of shares –
Redemption value –
Redetermination –
Redirect examination –
Redundancy –
Reentry –
Referee –
Referendum –
Reform Judaism –
Refugee –
Refundable tax credit –
Registered office –
Registered trade mark –
Registration statement –
Registry of deeds –
Regulation –
Regulations –
Regulatory taking –
Rehearing –
Reichstag Fire Decree –
Reid technique –
Release –
Release on one's own recognizance –
Relevancy –
Relief –
Religion and heterosexuality –
Religion and homosexuality –
Religious law –
Remainder –
Remainderman –
Remand (court procedure) –
Remittitur –
Rent –
Rent control –
Rental value –
Reorganization –
Repair –
Repeal –
Repentance –
Replevin –
Reply brief –
Reports –
Repossess –
Represent –
Representation –
Reprisal –
Reputation –
Requirements contract –res adjudicata –res gestae –res ipsa loquitur –res judicata –res nulis –res publica christiana –
Resale –
Rescind –
Rescission –
Rescue doctrine –
Reservation –
Reserved decision –
Resident –
Resident alien –
Residuary bequest –
Residuary estate –
Residuary legatee –
Residue –
Resistance movement –
Resisting arrest –
Resolution –
Resolution of disputes –respondeat superior –
Responsa –
Responsibility –
Restatement of the law –
Restitution –
Restorative justice –
Restraining order –
Restraint of trade –
Restraint on alienation –
Restrictive covenant –
Result –
Resulting trust –
Retaining lien –
Retention of title clause –
Retire –
Retraction –
Retrial –
Retributive justice –
Return of service –
Revenue ruling –
Reversible error –
Reversion –
Review –
Revocable living trust –
Revocation –
Revoke –
RICO –
Right of audience –
Right of eminent domain –
Right of survivorship –
Right of the first night –
Right-of-way –
Right to privacy –
Right to silence –
Right-to-work laws –
Rights –
Riot –
Riot control agent –
Riparian –
Riparian rights –
Risk –
Risk of loss –
Ritual –
Roadside test –
Robbery –
Robert's Rules of Order –
Rocket docket –
Rogatory letters –
Roman Forum –
Roman Inquisition –
Roman law –
Room –
Royal assent –
Royal charter –
Royal commission –
Royal Courts of Justice –
Royal prerogative –
Royal Warrant –
Royalties –
Rule –
Rule against perpetuities –
Rule by decree –
Rule in Allhusen v Whittell –
Rule in Re Atkinson –
Rule in Bartlett v Barclays Bank –
Rule in Clayton's Case –
Rule in Dearle v Hall –
Rule in Dumpor's Case –
Rule in Howe v Earl of Dartmouth –
Rule in Saunders v Vautier –
Rule in Shelley's Case –
Rule in Wild's Case –
Rule of law –
Rulemaking –
Rules of evidence –
Ruling –
Rum-running –
Running with the land –
Ruse of war

S
Sabotage –
Sacred text –
Salafi –
Sales tax –
Samaritan Pentateuch –
Same-sex marriage –
Sanctions –
Sanhedrin –Sasine –
Satyagraha –
Save harmless –
Savings and loan –
Scapegoat –
School of law –
Sciens –scienter –scire facias –
Scope of employment –
Scots law – 
Scrivener –
Scutage –se defendendo –
Seal –
Sealed verdict –
Sealing of records –
Search and seizure –
Search warrant –
Second degree murder –
Secondary boycott –
Secret police –
Secret rebate –
Secret tribunal –
Secret trust –
Secretary of State for the Home Department –
Secularism –
Secured creditor –
Secured transaction –
Security –
Security agreement –
Security deposit –
Security for costs –
Security interest –
Security of tenure –
Sedition –
Seduction –
Seigniorage –
Seised –
Seisin –
Seized –
Seizure –
Self-dealing –
Self-defense –
Self-determination –
Self-help –
Self-incrimination –
Seller –
Semble –
Semicha –
Senior lien –
Sentence (law) –
Separate property –
Separation –
Separation of church and state –
Separation of powers –
Separatism –
Septuagint –
Serf –seriatim –
Servant –
Service –
Service by fax –
Service by mail –
Service by publication –
Service mark –
Service of process –
Services –
Servient estate –
Set-aside –
Set-off –
Setting –
Settle –
Settlement –
Settlement agreement –
Settlor –
Seven deadly sins –
Severable contract –
Several liability –
Sex offender –
Sex offender registries in the United States –
Sex tourism –
Sex worker –
Sex-related court cases –
Sexual abuse –
Sexual assault –
Sexual discrimination –
Sexual harassment –
Sexual morality –
Sexual norm –
Shafi'i –
Shaikh –
Shall –
Shame –
Share –
Share capital –
Share certificate –
Shareholder –
Shareholders agreement –
Shareholders' agreement –
Shareholders' derivative action –
Shareholders' meeting –
Sharia law –Sharp practice –
Shepardize –
Sheriff –
Sheriff's sale –
Shield laws –
Shifting the burden of proof –
Shoplifting –
Short cause –
Shortening time –
Show cause order –
Shulkhan Arukh –
Sick pay –
Sidebar –
Sign –
Signature –
Signing bonus –
Silk –
Simple trust –
Simultaneous death act –
Sin –
Sin-offering –sine die –sine qua non –
Single life annuity –
Situated ethics –
Situational ethics –situs (law) –
Slander –
Slander of title –
Slavery –
Slavery at common law –
Small claims court –
Small claims track –
Smuggling –
Socage –
Social capital –
Social control –
Social justice –
Socialist law –
Society for Animal Protective Legislation –
Sodomy –
Sodomy law –
Software license –
Software patent –
Copyright infringement of software –
Sole proprietorship –
Solicitation –
Solicitor –
Solitary confinement –
Solvency –
Solvent –
Sound mind and memory –
Sounds in –
Southern Poverty Law Center –
Sovereign immunity –
Sovereignty –
Spanish Constitution of 1978 –
Spanish Inquisition –
Speaking demurrer –
Special administrator –
Special damages –
Special master –
Special prosecutor –
Special resolution –
Special verdict –
Specific bequest –
Specific devise –
Specific finding –
Specific legacy –
Specific performance –
Speculative damages –
Speed limit –
Speed trap –
Speedy trial –
Spendthrift clause –
Spendthrift trust –
Spoliation of evidence –
Spontaneous exclamation –
Spot zoning –
Spousal abuse –
Spousal support –
Springing interest –
Squatter –
Squatting –
Stakeholder –
Stamp duty –
Standard form contract –
Standard of care –
Standing –
Star Chamber –
Star chamber proceedings –stare decisis –
State action –
State of domicile –
State of Emergency –
State religion –
State-owned enterprise –
Stationhouse bail –
Statism –
Status conference –
Statute –
Statute of frauds –
Statute of limitations –
Statutes of fraud –
Statutes of limitations –
Statutory Instrument –
Statutory law –
Statutory offer of settlement –
Statutory rape –
Stay away order –
Stay of execution –
Stay of proceedings –
Stipendiary magistrate –
Stipulation –
Stock –
Stock certificate –
Stock in trade –
Stock option –
Stockholder –
Stockholders' derivative action –
Stoning –
Stop and frisk –
Strata title –
Strategic lawsuits against public participation –
Straw deed –
Straw man –
Street –
Strict construction –
Strict liability –
Strike –
Strike action –
Structure –sua sponte –sub judice –sub modo –sub nomine –sub silentio –
Sub-tenant –
Subchapter S corporation –
Subcontractor –
Sublease –
Sublet –
Submitted –
Subordination –
Subordination agreement –
Subornation of perjury –subpoena –subpoena ad testificum –subpoena duces tecum –
Subrogation –
Subrogee –
Subrogor –
Subscribe –
Subscribers –
Subsidiary company –
Substantial performance –
Substantive law –
Substituted service –
Substitution of attorney –
Succession –
Successive sentences –
Suffering –
Suffrage –
Suggestion of death -sui generis –
Suicide –
Suitor –
Sum certain –
Summary adjudication of issues –
Summary assessment –
Summary dismissal –
Summary judgment –
Summary offence –
Summation –
Summing –
Summons –
Sunnah –
Superior court –supersedeas –
Superseding cause –
Suppression of evidence –
Supremacy clause –
Supreme court –
Supreme Court of Canada –
Supreme Court of India –
Supreme Court of judicature –
Supreme Court of New Zealand –
Surety –
Surplusage –
Surrebutal –
Surrender –
Surrogate court –
Survivorship –
Suspended sentence –
Sustain –
Syndicate –
Synod –
Synthetic lease

T
T.R.O. –
Table A –
Tacking (law) –
Tainted evidence –
Taking the fifth –
Tallage –
Talmud –
Tangible personal property –
Tangible property –
Taqlid –
Targeting civilians –
Targum –
Tax –
Tax avoidance –
Tax costs –
Tax credit –
Tax deduction –
Tax evasion –
Tax haven –
Tax law –
Tax sale –
Tax treaty –
Taxation in the United States –
Taxation of costs –
Temporary injunction –
Temporary insanity –
Ten Commandments –
Tenancy –
Tenancy at sufferance –
Tenancy at will –
Tenancy by the entirety –
Tenancy in common –
Tenement –
Tentative trust –
Tenure –
Terms and conditions of employment –
Terms and conditions of purchase –
Terms and conditions of sale –
Terms of disparagement –terra nullius –
Territorial integrity –
Terrorism –
Test Act –
Testacy –
Testamentary –
Testamentary capacity –
Testamentary disposition –
Testamentary trust –
Testate –
Testator –
Testatrix –
Testify –
Testimony –
Texas Declaration of Independence –
Crown –
Old Bailey –
The problem of evil –
Theft –
Theocracy –
Third-party beneficiary –
Thirty-day notice –
Three strikes law –
Three theological virtues –
Tide lands –
Time is of the essence –
Time served –
Timeshare –
Tipstaff –
Tithe –
Title –
Title abstract –
Title insurance –
Title report –
Title search –
Toll –
Toll bridge –
Toll road –
Tontine –
Tools of trade –
Torah –
Torah study –
Torrens title –
Tort –
Tort claims act –
Tortfeasor –
Tortious –
Torture –
Tosafists –
Tosefta –
Total depravity –
Totalitarian democracy –
Totalitarianism –
Totten doctrine –
Totten trust –
Tracing (law) –
Trade –
Trade fixture –
Trade name –
Trade secret –
Trade union –
Trade-Related aspects of Intellectual Property rights –
Trademark –
Trademarks registry –
Tragedy of the commons –
Transfer agent –
Transfer in contemplation of death –
Transfer of shares –
Transferred intent –
Transparency –
Treason –
Treasure trove –
Treasury security –
Treasury stock –
Treaty –
Treaty of Waitangi –
Treble damages –
Trespass –
Trial –
Trial advocacy –
Trial by combat –
Trial by ordeal –
Trial court –
Trial de novo –
Trial in absentia –
Tribunal –
Tribute –
Trier of fact –trinoda necessitas –
Triple net lease –
Truancy –
True bill –
Trust law –
Trust fund –
Trust instrument –
Trustee –
Trustee in bankruptcy –
Trustor –
Trusts and estates –
Truth in Lending Act –
Try title –
Turn state's evidence –
Twelve Tables –
Twinkie defense

U
Uberrima fides –
UCC-1 –
Ulema –
Ultimate fact –ultra vires –
Ultrahazardous activity –
Unclean hands –
Unconscionable –
Unconstitutional –
Under the influence –
Underground Railroad –
Underwrite –
Underwriter –
Underwriting agreement –
Undisclosed principal –
Undivided interest –
Undue influence –
Unfair competition –
Unfair dismissal –
Unfree labour –
Unified estate and gift tax –
Uniform Code of Military Justice –
Uniform Commercial Code –
Uniform reciprocal enforcement of support act –
Unilateral contract –
Uninsured motorist clause –
Unissued stock –
Unitary state –
United Nations Charter –
United Nations Convention Against Torture –
United States bankruptcy court –
United States Bill of Rights –
United States Code –
United States Constitution –
United States constitutional law –
United States court of appeals –
United States Declaration of Independence –
United States Department of Justice –
United States district court –
United States Federal Income Tax Personal Exemption –
United States federal judicial circuit –
United States federal judicial district –
United States Office of the Independent Counsel –
United States Patent and Trademark Office –
United States prison population –
United States Supreme Court –
United States tax reform –
Trademark Law (United States) –
Universal Declaration on Animal Welfare –
Universal Declaration of Human Rights –
Universal jurisdiction –
Unjust enrichment –
Unjust taking –
Unlawful –
Unlawful assembly –
Unlawful detainer –uno flatu –
Unofficial law –
Unreasonable search and seizure –
Unspecified claim –
Use tax –
Usucaption –
Usufruct –
Usurious –
Usury –uti possidetis –
Utilitarianism –
Utility (patent)

V
Vacated judgment –Vacatio legis –
Valid claim –
Valuable consideration –
Variance –
Vehicular homicide –vel non –
Vendée –
Vendor –venire –
Venue (law) –
Verdict –
Vesting –
Vested remainder –
Vested right –
Vexatious litigation –
Vicarious liability –
Vice-Chancellor (UK legal system) –vice versa –vide –videlicet –
Vienna Convention on Diplomatic Relations –
Vienna Convention on the Law of Treaties –
Vigilantism –
Violence –
Virginia Declaration of Rights –
Virtue ethics –
Virtue jurisprudence –
Visitation right –viz.'' –
Void –
Vagueness doctrine –
Void marriage –
Voidable –
Voidable marriage –
Voir dire –
Volens –
Voluntary association –
Voluntary bankruptcy –
Voting trust –
Vulgate

W
Wage execution –
Wahhabism –
Waive –
Waiver –
Walking possession –
Waqf –
War crime –
War Crimes Law (Belgium) –
War on Drugs –
War Powers Resolution –
War reparations –
Ward (legal) –
Ward of court –
Wardship –
Warrant (legal) –
Warrant of committal –
Warrant of delivery –
Warrant of execution –
Warrant of possession –
Warranty –
Warranty deed –
Waste –
Watered stock –
Weimar constitution –
West American Digest System –
Wet reckless –
Whiplash (medicine) –
Whistleblower –
White collar crime –
Widow –
Widow's election –
Widower –
Will –
Will contest –
Willful –
Willfully –
Winding up –
Window tax –
Wiretap –
Witchhunt –
Witness –
Witness stand –
Witness statement –
Words of art –
Work stoppage –
Workers' compensation –
Workers' compensation acts –
Workmen's compensation –
World Declaration on Great Apes –
World Intellectual Property Organization –
World Trade Organization –
Writ –
Writ of attachment –
Writ of coram nobis –
Writ of execution –
Writ of mandate –
Wrongful death –
Wrongful discharge –
Wrongful dismissal –
Wrongful termination –
Wrongful trading

X
Nothing Law related seems to begin with X, if you find something please add it!

Y
Yellow Dog contract –
Yeshiva –
Youthful offender

Z
Zoning

References

Law topics